Brian C. Cornell (born  1958) is an American businessman. Cornell is the chairman and chief executive officer (CEO) of the Target Corporation. He is also non-executive chairman of Yum! Brands.

Early life
Brian Cornell was born in 1958 in Queens, New York City. He grew up in a fatherless household from the age of six, and his mother was living on welfare due to heart disease. As a result, Cornell was mostly brought up by his maternal grandparents.

Cornell graduated from the University of California, Los Angeles (UCLA) in 1981. Cornell attended the UCLA Anderson School of Management in 1991.

Business career
Cornell was the chief marketing officer and an executive vice president of Safeway Inc., from 2004 to 2007.

Cornell was the CEO of Michaels from 2007 to 2009, CEO of Sam's Club from 2009 to 2012, and CEO of PepsiCo Americas Foods, a subsidiary of PepsiCo, from 2012 to 2014.

Cornell was on the board of directors of OfficeMax, from 2004 to 2007, and of The Home Depot, from 2008 to 2009. Cornell has been on the board of Centerplate and Polaris Industries. Cornell has served on the Board of Directors of Yum! Brands since September 2015. He is the chairman of the Retail Industry Leaders Association, and a board member since 2015.

In August 2014, Cornell replaced Gregg Steinhafel as the chairman and CEO of Target. Cornell's leadership style is at once data-driven and hands-on. During his tenure, Cornell has shut down the loss-incurring Target Canada. Cornell has hired many outsiders to update the corporate culture. Cornell occasionally visits Target stores and asks guests about their shopping experiences.

In 2019, Cornell was named CNN's "Business CEO of The Year".

Cornell received "The Visionary" award from the National Retail Federation for 2022, given each year to "an outstanding retail industry leader".

Academic support
Cornell is on the board of visitors of the UCLA Anderson School of Management. He is on the board of directors for Catalyst and the museum council for the Smithsonian's National Museum of African American History and Culture.

Personal life

He is married to Martha Cornell. They have a daughter and a son.

References

1959 births
Living people
People from Queens, New York
University of California, Los Angeles alumni
American retail chief executives
American chairpersons of corporations
American corporate directors
Target Corporation people
UCLA Anderson School of Management alumni